Fayette S. Dunn (October 31, 1903 - December 11, 1979) was president and chairman of the board of the Otis Elevator Company starting in 1964.

References

See also
Elevator
 Escalator

1903 births
1979 deaths
Otis Worldwide